Spurrell's worm lizard (Amphisbaena spurrelli) is a species of amphisbaenian in the family Amphisbaenidae. The species is endemic to Central America and northern South America.

Etymology
The specific name, spurrelli, is in honor of British zoologist Herbert George Flaxman Spurrell.

Geographic range
A. spurrelli is found in Colombia and Panama.

Habitat

Description

Reproduction
A. spurrelli is oviparous.

References

Further reading
Boulenger GA (1915). "Descriptions of a new Amphisbæna and a new Snake discovered by Dr. H. G. F. Spurrell in Southern Colombia". Proceedings of the Zoological Society of London 1915: 659–661. (Amphisbæna spurrelli, new species, pp. 659–660, Text-figure 1).
Gans C (1962). "Notes on amphisbaenids (Amphisbaenia: Reptilia). 6. Redescription and range extension of Amphisbaena spurrelli Boulenger". Breviora (171): 1–11.
Vanzolini PE (2002). "An aid to the identification of the South American species of Amphisbaena (Squamata, Amphisbaenidae)". Papéis Avulsos de Zoologia, Museu de Zoologia da Universidade de São Paulo 42 (15): 351–362.

Amphisbaena (lizard)
Reptiles described in 1915
Taxa named by George Albert Boulenger